The 2009–10 Ethiopian Premier League is the season of the Ethiopian Premier League since its establishment in 1944. A total of 18 teams are contesting the league, with Saint-George SA the defending champions for the second year in a row and for the twenty third time in total. The Ethiopian season began on 6 August 2009.

Clubs
 Adama City FC
 Awassa City FC
 Banks SC
 Defence
 Dedebit
 Dire Dawa City
 EEPCO
 Ethiopian Coffee
 Ethiopian Insurance
 Harrar Beer Bottling FC
 Meta Abo Brewery
 Metehara Sugar
 Muger Cement
 Saint-George SA
 Sebeta City
 Sidama Coffee
 Southern Police
 Trans Ethiopia

Table and results

League table

Teams and stadiums  

Dedebit, Hawassa City, Sidama Coffee, Southern Police, Sebeta City, Dire Dawa City and Meta Abo also use 35,000 capacity Addis Ababa Stadium.

References

External links
www.khanua.jimdo.com
www.ethiofootball.com

Premier League
Premier League
Ethiopian Premier League
Ethiopian Premier League